Sunil Gavaskar is a former international cricketer who represented and captained the Indian cricket team. In a career spanning over 16 years he made 35 centuries (100 or more runs) at the international level.   Described as one of the greatest opening batsmen in cricket history, Gavaskar played 125 Test matches and scored 10,122 runs. He was the first batsman to score 10,000 Test runs and held the record for most runs until Allan Border surpassed it. Gavaskar's record of 34 Test centuries stood for almost two decades before Tendulkar surpassed it in December 2005. He was named the Indian Cricket Cricketer of the Year in 1971 and as one of the Wisden Cricketers of the Year in 1980. In February 2012, the International Cricket Council (ICC) inducted him into the ICC Cricket Hall of Fame. As of 2012, he is the third-highest run scorer for India in Test cricket, after Sachin Tendulkar and Rahul Dravid.

Making his Test debut against the West Indies in March 1971,  Gavaskar scored his first century in the third Test of the same series. In the final Test at Port of Spain he scored centuries in both innings of the match with scores of 124 and 220, becoming the second Indian player to perform the feat. He became the first player to score two centuries in a Test match for the third time, when he made 107 and 182 not out in a match against the West Indies in December 1978. Gavaskar's highest Test score of 236 not out came against the West Indies at Chennai in 1983, an Indian record at that time. He has scored 150 or more runs in a Test match innings on twelve occasions. Gavaskar was most successful against the West Indies and Australia scoring 13 and 8 centuries respectively.

Gavaskar made his One Day International (ODI) debut against England at Headingley in 1974. Unlike his Test career, his ODI career was less illustrious scoring 3,092 runs at an average of 35.13. Gavaskar's solitary century in ODIs came in the penultimate innings of his career—against New Zealand—during the 1987 Cricket World Cup where he scored 103 runs in 88 balls; the performance ensured India's victory, which earned him a man of the match award.

Key

Test cricket centuries

ODI centuries

Notes

References

External links 
Player Profile: Gavaskar from CricketArchive

Gavaskar, Sunil
Gavaskar